Edward Wilson "Ted" Scharf (born October 3, 1951) is a Canadian former professional ice hockey player. He played 238 games in the WHA with the New York Raiders, New York Golden Blades, Jersey Knights, San Diego Mariners, Indianapolis Racers, and Edmonton Oilers.

Career statistics

External links

1951 births
Canadian ice hockey right wingers
Edmonton Oilers (WHA) players
Hampton Gulls (SHL) players
Indianapolis Racers players
Kitchener Rangers players
Living people
Jersey Knights players
New York Golden Blades players
New York Raiders players
Ice hockey people from Ontario
Jersey Devils players
Long Island Ducks (ice hockey) players
Sportspeople from Greater Sudbury
Philadelphia Flyers draft picks
San Diego Mariners players